Del LaGrace Volcano (born July 26, 1957) is an American artist, performer, and activist from California. A formally trained photographer, Volcano's work includes installation, performance and film and interrogates the performance of gender on several levels, especially the performance of masculinity and femininity.

Identity 
Born intersex, Volcano developed both male and female characteristics as an adolescent but was raised and socialized as female. Volcano continued to live the first 37 years of their life as a woman, but since then has been living as both male and female. Del LaGrace Volcano (formerly named Della Grace) continues to adopt their true self through their name and gender. After marrying a queer man, Johnny Volcano, Del took on their current name to challenge the "bi-gendered status quo." Johnny has now changed his name while Del kept the surname and passed it on to their two children. Del has been in a partnership with the children's mother, Matilda Wurm since 2006. to which Del refers to themself as a "MaPa".

Life and career
Prior to moving to San Francisco when they were nineteen, Volcano attended Allan Hancock College as a student in the Visual Studies program from 1977 to 1979. Volcano earned an MA in Photographic Studies at University of Derby, UK in 1992 after studying photography at the San Francisco Art Institute from 1979 to 1981. Del LaGrace Volcano continues to further adopt their true self through their gender as well as their name.

Volcano's work complicates understandings of both femininity and masculinity by depicting lesbian masculinity. In "The Feminine Principle" Volcano takes queer femininities as a focus; including in this project is a portrait of Kate Bornstein. In "Lesbian Boyz and Other Inverts,"  Volcano's celebration of butch dykes, transsexual boys and other gender-queers. In the project, masculinity is shown as a tool of subversion.

Volcano's recent photographs demonstrate how intersex bodies can offer an entirely new perspective on the body.  The “normal” body in relation to Volcano's photographs becomes queer, describing the bodies in their latest works as "sites of mutation, loss, and longing."  In these newer works, Volcano takes on the loss of their friend, Kathy Acker and the transformation of their lover Simo Maronati's abled body into a disabled one.  Here, Volcano illustrates the queerness of any body marked by illness or trauma. Their self-portrait "INTER*me" photograph series (formally the "Herm Body" series) is a raw rendition of the artist's body using black and white Polaroid film, in conversation with their previous work it speaks to the construction of different age-selves and the technologies of gender in photography.

Volcano's artist statement of September 2005 reads:

Volcano also explores themes of both sexual and gender fluidity throughout their work. Volcano often depicts the instability of gender identity, by pushing past the binary gender system, and frequently uses their queerness in their work to contest the idea of sexual identity as something that is permanently embodied. As shown in Volcano's photography book, "Love Bites", Volcano presents various images of women at sexual play, dressed "in costumes ranging from brides to gay leather men". Volcano, in this way, seems to aim at defying conventional gender norms and feminist principles within their text. In Teddy Boy David, Volcano further pushes this agenda and toys with the idea of age dynamics and, mainly, youthfulness in terms of sexuality and sexual play.

Selected exhibitions 

 Corpus Queer: bodies in resistance, Transpalette, Emmetrop, Bourges, France September 2005
 Intersex 101: The Two Gender System as a Human Rights Abuse, NGBK gallery, Berlin, Germany June 2005
 A Boost in the Shell, Aeroplastics Gallery (Group Show) Brussels, Belgium May 2005
 Pas de Regrets, â la Galerie du Forum des images, France November 2003
 Female Turbulence, Aeroplastics Gallery, (Group Show) Brussels, Belgium October 2003
 Venus Boyz, Zita, Folkets Bio, Stockholm, Sweden May 2002
 Fallen Heroes: Masculinity & Representation, Espai D'Art Contemporani de Castello, (Group Show) CastÉleon, Spain April 2002
 Fluid Fire, Format Gallery, Malmo 2002
 Gerkhe's Artists, Hamburg Erotic Art Museum, 2001
 One Man? Show, Babele Gallery, Milan, Italy April 2001
 Fluid Fire, Galleri Format, Malmö, Sweden December 2001
 Sex Mutant, The Nunnery, (Group Show) London, UK August 2000
 A Kingdome Comes, Standpoint Gallery, London, UK July 1999
 Encounters of the Third Kind, Melkweg, (Group Show) Amsterdam, Netherlands August 1998
 Duke: King of the Hill, Courtauld Galleries, (Group Show) London, UK November 1999–2001
 Reterospective: Del LaGrace, Magazin 4, Bregenz, Austria September 1996
 Desire, Nordic Arts Centre, (Group Show) Helsinki, Finland; Kulturhuset, Stockholm, Sweden; Louisiana, Humlebœk, Denmark; 1995–97
 Street Style, Victoria & Albert Museum,(Group Show) London, UK June 1994

Volcano had a mid-career retrospective at the Leslie Lohman Museum in 2012.

Selected publications

Selected published works include:

Love Bites, as Della Grace, published by Gay Men's Press, London, 1991: "Perhaps the first published photographic monograph of lesbian sexuality in the world made from an insider's perspective. In the early 1990s LOVE BITES generated a great deal of controversy and censorship in both the mainstream and lesbian/gay media. In the USA it was banned by Customs & Excise for two weeks. In Canada they cut the most "offensive" photographs out of the book before selling it. In England it was sold by mainstream booksellers but not in lesbian or gay bookshops who protested they couldn't take the risk or disagreed with the SM content. Although it has been out of print for over 10 years it is still considered a queer classic."

The Drag King Book, co-authored with Judith "Jack" Halberstam, published by Serpent's Tail, 1999. The Drag King Book focusses on the drag kings of London, San Francisco, and New York. Volcano, in the book's forward, describes their first experience with a drag king act, which took place in San Francisco in 1985 when "the On Our Backs/ BurLEZK gang were putting on strip shows for lesbians at The Baybrick Inn."

Sublime Mutations, published by Konkursbuchverlag, 2000: "Sublime Mutations, a photographic retrospective of Del LaGrace Volcano's work produced over the course of the last ten years, visually remaps the political and theoretical cutting edge of the queer avant garde." In Jay Prossler's introduction, Prossler claims that through LaGrace Volcano's work "we see the changing shape of our bodies and our communities reflected". Importantly however, we also glimpse the changes promised by our was of seeing, the mutations we read as well as those that are visited upon our bodies. LaGrace Volcano skillfully demonstrates that sublime mutations are always already the transformations that viewers project on the physical world, and especially on the body.

Sex Works 1978–2005, also containing an essay by Beatriz Preciado. Published by Konkursbuchverlag, 2005. Sex Works shows a history of sex in the queer scene.

A contribution to the book Inter: Erfahrungen intergeschlechtlicher Menschen in der Welt der zwei Geschlechter, edited by Elisa Barth, in 2013. Other notable contributors include Mauro Cabral, Sally Gross, and Phoebe Hart.

A contribution to Queer Theory, edited by Iain Morland and Dino Willox, published in 2004. The book presents fifteen articles on sexuality, gender studies and other aspects of queer studies. Other notable contributors include Judith Butler, Patrick Califia, Cheryl Chase, Larry Kramer, and Stephen Whittle.

A contribution to Intersex and After, an issue of GLQ: A Journal of Lesbian and Gay Studies edited by Iain Morland in 2009. Notable contributors included Alice Dreger, Iain Morland, and Vernon Rosario.

Femmes of Power : Exploding Queer Feminities, co-authored with Ulrika Dahl. Published by Serpent's Tail in 2008

Volcano's photography featured in the sex-positive lesbian erotica publication Quim Magazine, published in the UK between 1989 and 2001.

Television and film work
Volcano appeared in Gabriel Baur's film, Venus Boyz.

References

External links
 Del LaGrace Volcano website

1957 births
Living people
Alumni of the University of Derby
American photographers
People with non-binary gender identities
Intersex non-binary people
Intersex rights activists
LGBT people from California
Photography about intersex
Queer artists
Transgender artists
Non-binary artists
Non-binary activists
American LGBT photographers
21st-century American LGBT people